Blue Alert is a jazz album recorded by Anjani, girlfriend and longtime backing singer of iconic Canadian singer-songwriter and poet Leonard Cohen, who also produced the album and wrote the lyrics. Also on the production team was John Lissauer, known for having previously produced two of Cohen's albums: New Skin for the Old Ceremony (1974) and Various Positions (1984).

The album was released in Canada on May 2, in the United States on May 19, and in Europe on June 5, 2006, by Columbia Records. It debuted at No. 16 on the Billboard Top Jazz Albums chart.

Track listing

 "Blue Alert"  – 5:39
 "Innermost Door"  – 3:16
 "The Golden Gate"  – 3:08
 "Half the Perfect World"  – 4:06
 "Nightingale"  – 3:00
 "No One After You"  – 4:09
 "Never Got to Love You"  – 4:36
 "The Mist"  – 3:08
 "Crazy to Love You"  – 4:51
 "Thanks for the Dance"  – 4:38

All songs written by Anjani Thomas (music) and Leonard Cohen (lyrics).

"Nightingale" was previously recorded by Cohen on Dear Heather. "The Mist" contains lyrical elements from "As the Mist Leaves No Scar", the same poem "True Love Leaves No Traces" is based on (see Death of a Ladies' Man). Later (2012), Leonard Cohen recorded his own version of "Crazy to Love You" for Old Ideas, and "Thanks for the Dance" on his 2019 album of the same name.

Personnel 

 Leonard Cohen – arranger, producer
 Larry Corbett – cello
 Bruce Dukov – violin
 Danny Frankel – drums
 Pamela Goldsmith – viola
 Brian Leonard – violin
 Greg Leisz – lap steel guitar
 John Lissauer – clarinet, arranger, keyboards, baritone saxophone
 Jeremy Lubbock – string arrangements
Technical
 Stephen Marcussen – mastering
 Ed Sanders – producer, engineer, mixing

References

External links
Anjani's Homepage
Blue Alert Homepage
Trusting the Force: Into the Heart of Blue Alert - Music Box, April 2007 (Vol. 14, #4)
Review by Pico Iyer in Shambhala Sun Magazine

2006 albums
Vocal jazz albums
Anjani albums
Columbia Records albums